The Wolf of Debt is a 1915 American silent drama film directed by Jack Harvey. The film stars William Garwood and Violet Mersereau and Fanny Hayes.

Cast
 William Garwood as Bruce Marsden
 Violet Mersereau as Helen Stanhope
 Fanny Hayes as Mrs. Stanhope
 Brinsley Shaw as Anthony Stuart
 Morgan Thorpe

External links

1915 films
1915 drama films
Silent American drama films
American silent feature films
American black-and-white films
Films directed by Jack Harvey
1910s American films